Two ships of the Italian Navy have been named Anteo:

 Italian landing ship Anteo (A 5306), a 1943 United States Navy tank landing ship, transferred to Italy in 1962 and decommissioned in 1973
 Italian ship Anteo (A 5309), a 1978 submarine rescue ship

Italian Navy ship names